The 2019 Pac-12 Football Championship Game was a college football game played on Friday, December 6, 2019, at Levi's Stadium in Santa Clara, California, to determine the 2019 champion of the Pac-12 Conference. The game featured the North division champions Oregon and the South division champions Utah, and was the conference's ninth championship game. This game was the last to be held at Levi's Stadium before the game moves to Allegiant Stadium in Las Vegas starting in 2020. With sponsorship by the 76 chain of gas stations, the game was officially called the 2019 Pac-12 Football Championship Game, presented by 76. Oregon won the game and the conference title by a score of 37–15.

Previous season
The 2018 Pac-12 Football Championship Game featured North Division champion Washington against South Division champion Utah in the conference's 8th edition of the game. The Huskies won in the game's lowest total scoring, 10–3.

Teams
The 2019 Pac–12 Football Championship Game was contested by the Oregon Ducks, North Division champions, and the Utah Utes, South Division Champions. Oregon and Utah had met 32 times previously before this game, with Oregon holding a 22–10 advantage in the series. The two teams did not meet during the 2019 regular season.

Oregon
Oregon clinched its spot in the Championship Game after its November 16 win over Arizona. This was Oregon's third overall appearance in the Championship Game, having won in their prior two appearances. This was Oregon's first appearance in the game since 2014, the year when the Ducks made their way into the first ever College Football Playoff and to the National Championship Game. Oregon had a 10–2 regular season record in 2019, and was 8–1 in Pac-12 play. The Ducks were designated as the home team, based on the two teams' record over their best common opponent, USC (Oregon won while Utah lost).

Utah
Utah secured its spot in the Championship Game with its November 30 win over Colorado. This was Utah's second appearance in the Championship Game, having also appeared the year prior. Utah entered the game with an 11–1 record, and 8–1 in Pac-12 play.

Game summary

Statistics

Utah received the opening kickoff, but their first drive ended in a turnover on downs at the Oregon 33 yard line. Oregon scored on their first possession with a three-yard run by C. J. Verdell. They took a 10–0 lead on the next possession with a 23-yard field goal by Camden Lewis. Early in the second quarter, the Ducks extended the lead with a 45-yard touchdown pass from Justin Herbert to Johnny Johnson III. Camden Lewis converted another field goal, from 30 yards out, to make the score 20–0 Oregon at half-time.

Oregon received the second half kickoff, but was forced to punt after a three-and-out. On Utah's first possession, they scored their first points of the day via a 24-yard touchdown pass from Tyler Huntley to Zack Moss. Oregon added three points with a 25-yard field goal by Lewis. Late in the third quarter, Utah scored again with a 25-yard touchdown pass from Huntley to Samson Nacua, and converted a two-point conversion from Huntley to Nacua to make the score 23–15. In the fourth quarter, Oregon put the game out of reach with two long touchdown runs by C. J. Verdell, the first a 70-yard run, and the second a 31-yard run. Oregon wound down the remaining seconds to win by a score of 37–15.

C. J. Verdell ran for 208 yards and three touchdowns and was named game MVP.

Aftermath
Oregon, who had been ranked 13th heading into the game, moved up to sixth in the final College Football Playoff rankings, and received a bid to the Rose Bowl against Big Ten runner-up Wisconsin, where they won 28–27. Utah moved down from fifth to 11th and received a bid to play Texas in the Alamo Bowl, where they lost 10–38.

See also
 List of Pac-12 Conference football champions

References

Championship
Pac-12 Football Championship Game
Utah Utes football games
Oregon Ducks football games
Sports competitions in Santa Clara, California
American football competitions in California
Pac-12 Football
Pac-12 Football